The yellow-throated big-eared bat or orange-throated bat(Lampronycteris brachyotis) is a species of bat that ranges from southern Mexico to Brazil. It is the only species within the genus Lampronycteris. A frugivore and insectivore, it is found in lowland forest up to an elevation of 700 m.  Its activity is greatest in the first two hours after sunset, and peaks again after midnight.

Description
The yellow-throated big-eared bat is characterized as a "medium-sized" leaf-nosed bat. Its ears are short and pointed, and its nose-leaf is relatively small. Its dorsal fur is dark brown or orange brown, and the ventral fur is orange or reddish-yellow.

Biology and ecology
The yellow-throated big-eared bat is primarily an insectivore, but it will also consume fruit, nectar, and pollen. It is nocturnal, roosting in sheltered places during the day, such as caves, mines, hollow trees, and archaeological ruins. It generally roosts in small colonies consisting of 10 or fewer individuals, though a colony of 300 individuals was once documented in Mexico.

Range and habitat
It is found in Belize, Brazil, Colombia, Costa Rica, French Guiana, Guatemala, Guyana, Mexico, Nicaragua, Panama, Peru, Suriname, Trinidad and Tobago, and Venezuela.

References

Phyllostomidae
Bats of Central America
Bats of South America
Bats of Brazil
Bats of Mexico
Mammals of Colombia
Mammals of French Guiana
Mammals of Guyana
Mammals of Peru
Mammals of Suriname
Mammals of Trinidad and Tobago
Mammals of Venezuela
Fauna of the Amazon
Mammals described in 1879
Taxa named by George Edward Dobson